The Red Hills Horse Trials is held in Tallahassee, in the U.S. state of Florida and is one of the equestrian world's top events. It is an annual major eventing competition held by the United States Eventing Association, Area III and the 16th event held in Area III consisting of Dressage, Cross-country, and Show jumping.

History 
Begun in 1998 under organizers Sallie Ausley (wife of DuBose Ausley) and Sylvia Ochs, it is named for the sloping terrain and rich red earth known as the Red Hills Region of north Florida and south Georgia. The RHHT, held in early March, draws over 40,000 spectators and visitors to view over 200 riders and their horses.

Non-profit affiliations 
Non-profit organizations that benefit from this event are Elinor Klapp-Phipps Park owned by the Northwest Florida Water Management District and managed by the city of Tallahassee, Tall Timbers Research Station to sustain science research, land conservation and educational initiatives, Tallahassee Friends of Our Parks Foundation and Red Hills Horse Camp for children.

Venue 

Elinor Klapp-Phipps Park hosts the Dressage and Stadium Jumping events, while adjoining Ayavalla Plantation, owned by Tallahassee ecologist and horse enthusiast Colin Phipps, hosts the cross-country event. 

The cross-country course was designed by Captain Mark Phillips, Chef d'Equipe and Technical Advisor for the United States Equestrian Team and a former member of the Great Britain Olympic team. The cross-country course was built by Scotland's Hugh Lochore. It features a variety of formidable obstacles, including water, banks and ditches, which wind through Phipps' arboretum. There are four dressage rings, the stadium course, and stabling facilities.

Divisions 
CIC-W *** and CIC**; Advanced, Intermediate, and Preliminary divisions. Entries automatically are entered in the USEA Gold Cup Series.

Events

Dressage 
"Dressage" (pronounced like massage) is derived from a French word that means "training." It is a prescribed set of movements has its roots in the European renaissance when the European riders developed a sequential training system considered to be the basis of modern dressage. Judges look for a supple, balanced and lively ride that showcases the horse's natural athletic ability. Judges evaluate each movement on a zero to 10 scale.

Cross country 

This second challenge has horse and rider maneuvering through fence obstacles. Competitors must negotiate the course at the correct angle, height and speed to clear fences. The rider may inspect the course beforehand, but the horse leaves the starting box not knowing what lies ahead, demanding absolute trust between horse and rider.

Stadium jumping 
The final phase has horse and rider jump a series of painted fences in an enclosed arena. If a horse falls, balks or knocks down any portion of an obstacle, a penalty point, or fault, is added to the score. Stadium jumping tests the obedience and suppleness of the horse and demonstrates that sufficient stamina and fitness still remain after the cross-country event.

Visitors 
The "Red Hills Avenue of Shops" provides visitors and patrons a variety of vendors including English tack and riding apparel, horse jumping equipment, a food court, specialty feeds, artwork, jewelry, real estate, USEA books, women's apparel, and sculpture.

2008 
The 2008 Red Hills Horse Trials was very somber. Olympian Darren Chiacchia was seriously injured on the preliminary course riding Baron Verdi, who flipped rotationally. The horse is uninjured. Jonathan Holling's horse, Direct Merger died instantly while galloping after fence 8 on the CIC***W course. Missy Miller's horse Leprechauns Rowdy Boy died instantly after a rotational fall at the water on the advanced course. Holling and Miller were unharmed.

External links 
Red Hills Horse Trials
United States Olympic Equestrian Team
USEA Area III
United States Eventing Association

Eventing
Culture of Tallahassee, Florida
Sports in Tallahassee, Florida
Equestrian sports competitions in the United States
Tourist attractions in Tallahassee, Florida